Raquel Castro is an American actress and singer. She is known for starring in the 2004 film Jersey Girl as Gertie Trinké, the daughter of Ollie Trinké (Ben Affleck) and Gertrude Steiney (Jennifer Lopez), for which Castro won the Young Artist Award for the Best Performance in a Feature Film – Young Actress Age Ten or Younger. She was a contestant in the American version of The Voice.

Background 
Castro's father is Puerto Rican, and her mother is of Italian and Jewish descent.

Career

Acting 
Castro made her acting debut in an episode of the television series, Third Watch. She then played the daughter of Ben Affleck and Jennifer Lopez's characters in the 2004 film Jersey Girl, directed by Kevin Smith. She appeared in a 2005 episode of Law & Order: Special Victims Unit entitled "Alien" and in the independent film Little Fugitive. Castro appeared in two second-season episodes of Liv & Maddie ("BFF-A-Rooney" and "SPARF-A-Rooney") as Liv's friend South Salamanca.

In 2006, she was cast as Nicole in the music video for the Ludacris song "Runaway Love" with Mary J. Blige, where she plays an abused self-conscious girl who runs away. She later was featured in the 2007 independent film, Tracks of Color. She has a role in The Ministers (2009), starring John Leguizamo. Raquel also spent quite a few years at a dance studio with her younger brother on Long Island.

Singing 
Castro was a contestant on the first season of the reality television singing competition program The Voice, She was selected in the Blind Audition round and was coached by Christina Aguilera. She progressed to the first round of the Live shows before being eliminated with Lily Elise in favor of Frenchie Davis and Beverly McClellan.

Castro recorded a cover of Aguilera's "Ain't No Other Man" and posted it on YouTube. Castro has also listed Christina Aguilera and Selena as her idols and major influences. 

Castro released her first single titled "Diary". According to her YouTube page, the song was written by Alyssa Bonagura and Ted Bruner. It was produced by J Chris Griffin. It was released on iTunes and CDBaby on February 1, 2012. She has uploaded the music video for "Diary" on YouTube and recorded a dance remix of the song, released on March 11, 2012. The remix was released under the title "Diary (J Chris Griffin Remix)". She is also working on her debut album.

A single called "Game Over" was released on January 29, 2013. Castro wrote it with the help of the IDA Program.

In 2019, Castro provided vocals for the theme song to the Netflix Original Series Carmen Sandiego.

Castro was also on season 2 of NBC's Songland, where she presented her song "Wrong Places" to H.E.R., where she picked her song to put on her album.

Filmography

Discography

Albums as part of Empire cast

Singles

Music videos

Songwriting credits

Awards and nominations

References

External links 

 
 
 JoBlo interview (March 25, 2004)

1994 births
Living people
21st-century American actresses
21st-century American women singers
American child actresses
American film actresses
American television actresses
American women pop singers
American women singer-songwriters
People from Long Island
American people of Italian descent
American people of Jewish descent
American people of Puerto Rican descent
Hispanic and Latino American actresses
The Voice (franchise) contestants
21st-century American singers